Otto Fönnekold (15 February 1920 – 31 August 1944) was a German Luftwaffe military aviator during World War II, a fighter ace credited with 136 aerial victories—that is, 136 aerial combat encounters resulting in the destruction of the enemy aircraft. All but three of his victories were claimed over the Soviet Air Forces in about 600 combat missions.

Born in Hamburg, Fönnekold was trained as a fighter pilot and posted to Jagdgeschwader 52 (JG 52–52nd Fighter Wing) in late 1942. Fighting on the Eastern Front, he claimed his first aerial victory on 7 September 1942 during Case Blue, the German strategic 1942 summer offensive in southern Russia. On 12 January 1944, Fönnekold was credited with his 100th aerial victory and was awarded the Knight's Cross of the Iron Cross on 26 March 1944. In April 1944, he was appointed Staffelkapitän (squadron leader) of 5. Staffel (5th squadron) of JG 52. He was killed in action on 31 August 1944 by a strafing US North American P-51 Mustang at the airfield in Ssaß-Budak.

Career
Fönnekold was born on 15 February 1920 in Hamburg of the Weimar Republic. Following flight training, he was posted to the 5. Staffel (5th squadron) of Jagdgeschwader 52 (JG 52—52nd Fighter Wing) in the fall of 1942. At the time, this squadron was officially commanded by Oberleutnant Siegfried Simsch who was on home leave recovering from wounds sustained on 29 May. 5. Staffel was a squadron of II. Gruppe (2nd group) of JG 52 commanded by Hauptmann Johannes Steinhoff.

War against the Soviet Union

World War II in Europe had begun on Friday 1 September 1939 when German forces invaded Poland. Germany had launched Operation Barbarossa, the invasion of the Soviet Union on 22 June 1941. A year later, German forces launched Operation Fridericus II, the attack on Kupiansk, a preliminary operation to Case Blue, the strategic 1942 summer offensive in southern Russia. In August 1942, II. Gruppe was subordinated to VIII. Fliegerkorps and supported the 6th Army offensive to capture Stalingrad. On 6 September, II. Gruppe reached an airfield named Gonschtakowka located north-northeast of Mozdok on the Terek in the Caucasus.

Fönnekold claimed his first aerial victory on 7 September when he shot down a Lavochkin-Gorbunov-Gudkov LaGG-3 fighter. The Gruppe then moved to Maykop located in the North Caucasus on 21 September where, with the exception of 24 to 29 October, they were based until 26 November. Operating from Maykop, Fönnekold claimed his second aerial victory, an Ilyushin Il-2 ground-attack aircraft shot down on 6 October. There, he claimed three further aerial victories over LaGG-3 fighters, one each on 29 October, 15 and 19 November. On 19 November, Soviet forces launched Operation Uranus which led to the encirclement of Axis forces in the vicinity of Stalingrad. To support the German forces fighting in the Battle of Stalingrad forced the Luftwaffe to relocate its forces and ordered II. There, Fönnekold claimed another LaGG-3 fighter shot down on 11 December before the Gruppe moved to Zimovniki the following day.

On 17 December, II. Gruppe relocated again, this time to Kotelnikovo where they stayed until 26 December. Operating from Kotelnikovo, Fönnekold claimed a Lavochkin La-5 fighter shot down on 22 December and another on 25 December. On 22 January 1943, II. Gruppe had to retreat further and moved to an airfield at Rostov-on-Don where Fönnekold shot down a LaGG-3 fighter on 30 January. On 7 February 1943, the Gruppe moved to Kuteinikowo near Stalino, present-day Donetsk, where Fönnekold claimed two Yakovlev Yak-1 the following day.

Kuban bridgehead and Crimea
The Gruppe was moved to the combat area of the Kuban bridgehead on 10 February 1943 where it was initially based at an airfield at Slavyansk-na-Kubani. Due to whether conditions, II. Gruppe then moved to Kerch on 16 February. While based at Slavyansk-na-Kubani, Fönnekold claimed two Polikarpov I-16 fighters shot down on 14 February and a Polikarpov I-153 biplane fighter on 27 February. On 13 March, the Gruppe moved to Anapa located on the northern coast of the Black Sea near the Sea of Azov and was fighting in the Battle of the Caucasus.

On 8 May, Leutnant Helmut Haberda, who had led 5. Staffel since Simsch was injured in November 1942, was killed in action. In consequence Oberleutnant Wilhelm Batz was appointed Staffelkapitän (Squadron Leader) of the Staffel on 9 May. That day, Fönnekold claimed a LaGG-3 fighter shot down. By 31 May, he claimed ten further aerial victories, increasing his total to 28 aerial victories. In June, Fönnekold added seven more claims, reaching 35 aerial victories. While in July the bulk of the Luftwaffe fighter force was being concentrated further north and fought in the Battle of Kursk, II. Gruppe with some exceptions remained at Anapa. Here, Fönnekold claimed further aerial victories, reaching 39 claims by end of July and 49 claims by end of August. Fönnekold was awarded the Honour Goblet of the Luftwaffe on 9 August and the German Cross in Gold on 6 September 1943.

On 1 September, II. There, Fönnekold claimed four aerial victories total. On 6, 7 and 8 September he claimed an Il-2 ground-attack aircraft shot down, and on 10 September he was credited with the destruction of a Yak-1 fighter, taking his total to 53 claims. The Gruppe relocated to an airfield named Beresowka near the Inhulets, located approximately halfway between Kremenchuk and Kirovohrad. Two days later, the Gruppe was ordered to Askania-Nova. By the end of October 1943, Fönnekold's number of aerial victories claimed had increased to 65, making him the second most successful and still living fighter pilot in II. Gruppe at the time. The Gruppe had moved to Kherson on 30 October and then transferred to Baherove on the Crimean peninsula where they were based until 19 March 1944.

Based at Baherove, Fönnekold increased his number of aerial victories to 80 by end November and to 92 aerial victory claims by the end of 1943. On 12 January 1944, Fönnekold claimed three aerial victories, including his 100th aerial victory in total. He was the 62nd Luftwaffe pilot to achieve the century mark. Fönnekold was awarded the Knight's Cross of the Iron Cross on 26 March 1944. On 8 April, Soviet forces launched the Crimean offensive, forcing the Germans to evacuate the Crimea. By this date, Fönnekold had accumulated 116 aerial victories.

Squadron leader and death
On 14 April 1944, II. Gruppe moved to an airfield at Chersonesus at Sevastopol where they were based until 9 May. On 19 April, Fönnekold was appointed Staffelkapitän of 5. Staffel of JG 52 when its former commander, Batz, was appointed Gruppenkommandeur of III. Gruppe of JG 52. The Gruppe was transferred to Huși at the Prut River on 27 May 1944. There, on 30 May, Fönnekold became an "ace-in-a-day" when claimed seven Bell P-39 Airacobra fighters and a single Yak-1 fighter shot down near Tudora and Iași. Included in this figure are three claims over P-39 fighters from 129 GvIAP (Guards Fighter Aviation Regiment—Gvardeyskiy Istrebitelny Aviatsionny Polk). On 9 July, aerial combat with two Yakovlev Yak-9 fighters resulted in a forced landing of his Messerschmitt Bf 109 G-6 (Werknummer 163564—factory number) near Iași.

On 29 August, III. Gruppe relocated to an airfield at Budak, present-day Budacu de Sus and part of Dumitrița. Fönnekold claimed three United States Army Air Forces (USAAF) North American P-51 Mustang fighters shot down near Luieriu (Lövér) on 31 August. Later that day, he was bounced during his landing approach at Ssaß-Budak by P-51 fighters. One of the .50 caliber projectiles penetrated his heart while taxiing his Bf 109 G-6 (Werknummer 441931) "black 9". He was succeeded by Heinrich Sturm as commander of 5. Staffel. Fönnekold was buried on the cemetery at Ssaß-Budak.

Summary of career

Aerial victory claims
According to US historian David T. Zabecki, Fönnekold was credited with 136 aerial victories. Spick also lists Fönnekold with 136 aerial victories claimed in approximately 600 combat missions. Mathews and Foreman, authors of Luftwaffe Aces — Biographies and Victory Claims, researched the German Federal Archives and found records for 134 confirmed and three unconfirmed aerial victories. All these victories were claimed on the Eastern Front.

Victory claims were logged to a map-reference (PQ = Planquadrat), for example "PQ 54512". These sectors were then subdivided into 36 smaller units to give a location area 3 × 4 km in size.

Awards
 Honour Goblet of the Luftwaffe on 9 August 1943 as Feldwebel and pilot
 German Cross in Gold on 16 August 1943 as Feldwebel in the 5./Jagdgeschwader 52
 Knight's Cross of the Iron Cross on 26 March 1944 as Leutnant and pilot in the II./Jagdgeschwader 52

Notes

References

Citations

Bibliography

 
 
 
 
 
 
 
 
 
 
 
 
 
 
 
 
 
 

1920 births
1944 deaths
Military personnel from Hamburg
Luftwaffe pilots
German World War II flying aces
Luftwaffe personnel killed in World War II
Recipients of the Gold German Cross
Recipients of the Knight's Cross of the Iron Cross